Prières Abbey ( or Notre-Dame de Prières) is a former Cistercian monastery in the commune of Billiers in the department of Morbihan, Brittany, France, about 28 kilometres southeast of Vannes near the coast and the mouth of the River Vilaine.

History 
The abbey was founded in 1251 and richly endowed by Duke John I of Brittany, as penance for his earlier destruction of the Priory of Saint-Pabu and annexation of its lands during the construction of the Château de Suscinio. The new abbey was a daughter house of Buzay Abbey (of the filiation of Clairvaux), from where the first monks came. Among its temporal endowments were the saltpans of the Guérande peninsula.

The abbey was rebuilt in the 17th century. In 1791, in the French Revolution, it was dissolved. The premises were subsequently used as a barracks. The site passed into private hands in 1801, after which most of the buildings were demolished. The remaining parts are now used by a rehabilitation centre.

Description 
Of the church, rebuilt in the early 18th century by the architect Olivier Delourme, there remain only the tower and part of the former transept converted into a chapel that contains the remains of the tombs of Duke John I (d. 1286) and of Isabella of Castile (d. 1328), the second wife of Duke John III of Brittany. Also extant are the 18th-century guest lodgings, some service buildings and the precinct wall of 1699.

Sources 
 Bernard Peugniez, 2001: Routier cistercien. Abbayes et sites. France, Belgique, Luxembourg, Suisse. (new expanded edition, p. 90). Éditions Gaud, Moisenay 
 Jh.-M. Le Mené: Abbaye de Prières in Bulletin et Mémoires de la société polymathique du Morbihan, 1903, pp. 8–80

External links 
 Website of the commune of Billiers: history and photos of the abbey

Cistercian monasteries in France
Buildings and structures in Morbihan
1250s establishments in France